The Owl Nebula (also known as Messier 97, M97 or NGC 3587) is a starburst ("planetary") nebula approximately 2,030 light years away in the northern constellation Ursa Major. The estimated age of the Owl Nebula is about 8,000 years. It is approximately circular in cross-section with faint internal structure. It was formed from the outflow of material from the stellar wind of the central star as it evolved along the asymptotic giant branch. The nebula is arranged in three concentric shells/envelopes, with the outermost shell being about 20–30% larger than the inner shell. A mildly owl-like appearance of the nebula is the result of an inner shell that is not circularly symmetric, but instead forms a barrel-like structure aligned at an angle of 45° to the line of sight.

The nebula holds about 0.13 solar masses of matter, including hydrogen, helium, nitrogen, oxygen, and sulfur; all with a density of less than 100 particles per cubic centimeter.

The 14th magnitude central star has passed an apex of its evolution so is condensing to form a white dwarf. It has 55% to 60% of solar mass, is 41 to 148 times solar luminosity, and has an effective temperature of 123,000 K. The star has been successfully resolved by the Spitzer Space Telescope as a point source that does not show the infrared excess characteristic of a circumstellar disk.

History 
The Owl Nebula was discovered by French astronomer Pierre Méchain on February 16, 1781. Pierre Méchain was Charles Messier's observing colleague, and the nebula was observed by Messier himself a few weeks following the initial sighting. Thus, the object was named Messier 97, and included in his catalog on March 24, 1781. Of the object, he noted "Nebula in the great Bear, near Beta: It is difficult to see, reports M. Méchain, especially when one illuminates the micrometer wires: its light is faint, without a star. M. Méchain saw it the first time on Feb 16, 1781, & the position is that given by him. Near this nebula he has seen another one, [the position of] which has not yet been determined [Messier 108], and also a third which is near Gamma of the Great Bear [Messier 109]. (diam. 2′)." In 1844, Admiral William H. Smyth  classified the object as a planetary nebula.  When William Parsons, 3rd Earl of Rosse, observed the nebula in Ireland in 1848, his hand-drawn illustration resembled an owl's head. In his notes, the object was described as  “Two stars considerably apart in the central region, dark penumbra round each spiral arrangement, with stars as apparent centres of attraction. Stars sparkling in it; resolvable.” It has been known as the Owl Nebula ever since. More recent developments in the late 1900s include the discovery of a giant red halo of wind extended around its inner shells, and the mapping of the nebula's structure.

Observing 
Although the Owl Nebula can not be seen with the naked eye, a faint image of it can be observed under remarkably good conditions with a small telescope or 20×80 binoculars. To make out the nebula's more distinctive owl like eye features, a telescope with an aperture 10" or better is required. To locate the nebula in the night sky, look to the southwest corner of the Big Dipper's bowl, marked by the star Beta Ursae Majoris. From there, M97 lies just over 2.5 degrees in the southeast direction towards the star positioned opposite Beta Ursae Majoris in the other bottom corner of the Big Dippers Bowl, Gamma Ursae Majoris; which marks the constellations southwest corner. M97, together with Alpha Ursae Majoris, point the way to Polaris.

Gallery

See also 
 Messier object
 List of Messier objects
 New General Catalogue
 List of planetary nebulae

References

External links

 The Owl Nebula @ SEDS Messier pages
 The Owl Nebula at Calar Alto Observatory
 NightSkyInfo.com – M97, the Owl Nebula
 
 
 The Owl Nebula (M97) at Constellation Guide
Messier 97: Owl Nebula at Messier Objects

Messier objects
NGC objects
Planetary nebulae
Ursa Major (constellation)
Astronomical objects discovered in 1781
Discoveries by Pierre Méchain